is a Japanese footballer currently playing as a defender for Kamatamare Sanuki.

Career statistics

Club
.

Notes

References

External links

1997 births
Living people
Japanese footballers
Association football defenders
Ritsumeikan University alumni
J3 League players
Kamatamare Sanuki players